BMP1 may refer to:

Bone morphogenetic protein 1
Fighting vehicle BMP-1

See also
 BMP (disambiguation)
 BMP2 (disambiguation)